Greenleaf Lake is a lake in Meeker County, in the U.S. state of Minnesota. It measures 18 feet at its deepest, and is used for both fishing and recreation.

Greenleaf Lake was named for William H. Greenleaf, an early settler.

See also
List of lakes in Minnesota

References

Lakes of Minnesota
Lakes of Meeker County, Minnesota